Castle of Aixa, also known as Castell de la Solana (not to be confused with the current landhouse in Alcalalí named Castell de la Solana), consists of the remains of the ancient castle in the mountains of the Castellet de Aixa in the highest part of Beniquesi, a location in the municipal district of Alcalalí (Spain), 600 meters above sea level, between Llosa de Camacho and Jalón and covering the entire Pop Valley.

The castle is in ruins and only some remains of its base and walls can be seen.   Its rectangular tower of 12 by 4 meters has three shallow pools and a fountain.

References

External links
Castell de la Solana

Castles in the Valencian Community